Birky or Borki may refer to the following locations in Ukraine:

 Birky, Kharkiv Raion, Kharkiv Oblast, town
 Birky, Chuhuiv Raion, Kharkiv Oblast, village
 Birky, Yavoriv Raion, village in Lviv Oblast